The Taurus ground squirrel (Spermophilus taurensis) is a species of rodent in the family Sciuridae. It is endemic to the Taurus Mountains of Turkey. It was first identified as a distinct species to the Asia Minor ground squirrel in 2007.

References

 Heterochromatin distribution and nucleolar organizer regions (NORs) in chromosomes of the Taurus ground squirrel, Spermophilus taurensis Gunduz et al., 2007 (Mammalia: Rodentia), in Turkey, Turk J Zool

Spermophilus
Endemic fauna of Turkey
Mammals described in 2007